Odd Arne Espevoll (born 5 June 1976) is a retired Norwegian football defender.

He hails from Vikedal and started his career in Vindafjord IL. He made his debut for Viking FK in late 1994 and remained there through 2003, except the season 2001 when he was loaned out to FK Haugesund. In 2004 he joined Hinna, then Jarl.

Espevoll was capped for Norway on under-21 level. He participated in the bronze medal-winning squad at the 1998 UEFA European Under-21 Championship.

References

1976 births
Living people
People from Vindafjord
Norwegian footballers
Viking FK players
FK Haugesund players
Hinna Fotball players
Norwegian First Division players
Eliteserien players
Association football defenders
Norway under-21 international footballers
Sportspeople from Rogaland